Camp O'pera (also, Camp Opera) is a former settlement and mining camp in Amador County, California. It was founded by Mexicans in the summer of 1849 near French Camp, southeast of Ione, California.

By 1853, it was growing and by 1857 was at its height. By the early 1860s, the town was in decline. Camp O'pera was a reputed hideout for the infamous outlaw Joaquin Murieta.

References

Former settlements in Amador County, California
Former populated places in California
Populated places established in 1849
1849 establishments in California